Gipping is a village and civil parish in the Mid Suffolk district of Suffolk in eastern England. Located around three miles north north-east of Stowmarket, in 2005 its population was 80. At the 2011 Census the population remained less than 100 and was included in the civil parish of Old Newton with Dagworth.

The parish contains Great Gipping Wood, an ancient woodland and SSSI, whilst the River Gipping runs through it. It shares a parish council with neighbouring Old Newton with Dagworth.

The village is linked with the family of Sir James Tyrell who was supposedly responsible for murdering the Princes in the Tower under Richard III and was executed by order of Henry VII in 1502 for treason. He built a chapel in the village in the 1470s, which is still there.

References

External links

Old Newton with Dagworth and Gipping Parish Council

Villages in Suffolk
Civil parishes in Suffolk
Mid Suffolk District